The 315th Engineer Battalion is a multi-role engineer battalion of the United States Army based in Camp Pendleton, California. Activated 16 October 2009 at Camp Pendleton, the battalion traces its lineage back to World War I. It is a United States Army Reserve formation and is subordinate to the 301st Maneuver Enhancement Brigade out of Fort Lewis, WA.

Lineage 

Constituted 5 August 1917 in the National Army as the 315th Engineers, an element of the 90th Division

Organized in August 1917 at Camp Travis, Texas

Demobilized 26 June 1919 at Camp Dodge, Iowa

Reconstituted 24 June 1921 in the Organized Reserves as the 315th Engineers, an element of the 90th Division

Organized in November 1921 at San Antonio, Texas

Regiment (less 2d Battalion) reorganized and redesignated 30 January 1942 as the 315th Engineer Battalion, an element of the 90th Division (later designated as the 90th Infantry Division) (2d Battalion concurrently reorganized and redesignated as the 869th Engineer Battalion—hearafter separate lineage)

Ordered into active military service 25 March 1942 at Camp Barkeley, Texas

Reorganized and Redesignated 15 September 1942 as the 315th Engineer Motorized Battalion

Reorganized and redesignated 19 May 1943 as the 315th Engineer Combat Battalion

Inactivated 22 December 1945 at Camp Patrick Henry, Virginia

Activated 28 April 1947 at San Antonio, Texas

(Organized Reserves redesignated 25 March 1948 as the Organized Reserve Corps; redesignated 9 July 1952 as the Army Reserve)

Reorganized and redesignated 6 April 1953 as the 315th Engineer Battalion

(Location of Headquarters changed 1 April 1959 to Houston, Texas)

Inactivated 31 December 1965 at Houston, Texas, and relieved from assignment from the 90th Infantry Division

Headquarters activated 16 October 2009 at Camp Pendleton, California. 

315th Engineer Battalion deployed in 2014 ISO OEF - Afghanistan.

As of June 2021, Battalion is pending relocation to Miramar MCAS - East.

Honors

Campaign streamers

Unit Decorations

References

External links
Lineage and Honors: 315th Engineer Battalion

Engineer battalions of the United States Army